Sven Tommy Karls (born October 13, 1961) is a Swedish sprint and marathon canoeist who competed in the 1980s. He won a silver medal in the K-4 1000 m event at the 1984 Summer Olympics in Los Angeles.

Karls also won a silver medal in the K-4 10000 m event at the 1985 ICF Canoe Sprint World Championships in Mechelen.

References

Sports-reference.com profile

1961 births
Living people
Swedish male canoeists
Olympic canoeists of Sweden
Olympic silver medalists for Sweden
Olympic medalists in canoeing
Canoeists at the 1984 Summer Olympics
Medalists at the 1984 Summer Olympics
ICF Canoe Sprint World Championships medalists in kayak
Medalists at the ICF Canoe Marathon World Championships